Doublebois (pronounced  ), is a village in south Cornwall, England, United Kingdom. It is in the civil parish of Dobwalls approximately three miles (5 km) west of Liskeard.

Doublebois formerly had a railway station on the Cornish Main Line which closed on 5 October 1964. Today the main transport link is the adjacent A38 Plymouth to Bodmin trunk road.

References

Villages in Cornwall